Julian Lawton is a shooting competitor for New Zealand.

At the 1990 Commonwealth Games he won a bronze medal in the 10m air pistol pairs with Greg Yelavich and also competed in the 10m air pistol, coming 8th.

At the 1994 Commonwealth Games he won a silver medal in the 50m free pistol with, and competed in the 10m air pistol, coming 19th; the 10m air pistol pairs with ...., coming 7th and the 50m free pistol, coming ....

External links 
 

Living people
Year of birth missing (living people)
New Zealand male sport shooters
Commonwealth Games silver medallists for New Zealand
Commonwealth Games bronze medallists for New Zealand
Shooters at the 1990 Commonwealth Games
Shooters at the 1994 Commonwealth Games
Commonwealth Games medallists in shooting
Medallists at the 1990 Commonwealth Games
Medallists at the 1994 Commonwealth Games